Jessica Buettner (born 1995 is a Canadian powerlifter, who won the gold medal in the 2022 IPF 76kg open powerlifting classic  and who won the silver medal in the 72 kg - Raw class at 2019 IPF World Championship in Helsingborg. She also broke three junior powerlifting records at 2018 World Championship, and she previously competed in shot put.

References

1995 births
Living people
Canadian powerlifters
Female powerlifters